Bois Moquette, is a town in the Jacmel Arrondissement, in the Ouest department of Haiti.

References

Populated places in Haiti